Otrhánky is a village and municipality in Bánovce nad Bebravou District in the Trenčín Region of north-western Slovakia.

History
In historical records the village was first mentioned in 1598.

Geography
The municipality lies at an altitude of 215 metres and covers an area of 4.645 km². It has a population of about 430 people.

Famous people 
 Ján Chrenko (*1908 – † 1982), SDB,  Roman Catholic priest end religious prisoner (sentenced to 14 years in prison).

References

External links
 Official page
http://www.statistics.sk/mosmis/eng/run.html
 https://web.archive.org/web/20070202035259/http://web.orange.sk/obec.otrhanky/

Villages and municipalities in Bánovce nad Bebravou District